The Central Coordinating Register for Legal Entities (Norwegian: Enhetsregisteret) is a Norwegian registry, established in 1995, that stores information about juristic persons (including self-employed people who have chosen to register, and governmental agencies). It is organized under Nærings- og handelsdepartementet.

In 2011, its digital database was made available to participants of the "Open Data Day Hackathon" in Oslo and Bergen.

See also
Brønnøysund Register Centre

References

Government of Norway
Government agencies established in 1995
1995 establishments in Norway